Victoria Beach may refer to
 Rural Municipality of Victoria Beach, a municipality in Manitoba
 Victoria Beach, Nova Scotia